The 1927 Rice Owls football team was an American football team that represented Rice University as a member of the Southwest Conference (SWC) during the 1927 college football season. In its fourth and final season under head coach John Heisman, the team compiled a 2–6–1 record (0–4 against SWC opponents) and was outscored by a total of 160 to 64.

Schedule

References

Rice
Rice Owls football seasons
Rice Owls football